Below is an incomplete list of feature films, television films or TV series which include events of the Napoleonic Wars. This list does not include documentaries, short films.

1910s

1920s

1930s

1940s

1950s

1960s

1970s

1980s

1990s

2000s

2010s

2020s

Upcoming films

Science fiction, fantasy, thriller and horror

Television films

TV Series

Napoleonic Wars
Napoleonic Wars
Napoleonic Wars films